Peter Hill Beard (January 22, 1938 – March 31 / April 19, 2020) was an American artist, photographer, diarist, and writer who lived and worked in New York City, Montauk and Kenya.  His photographs of Africa, African animals and the journals that often integrated his photographs, have been widely shown and published since the 1960s.

Early life and education

Peter Beard was born in 1938 in New York, the son of Roseanne (Hoare) and Anson McCook Beard Jr., heir to a railroad fortune. He was raised in New York City, Alabama, and Islip, Long Island. Beard began keeping diaries as a young boy and making photographs, as an extension of the diaries, at the age of 12. A graduate of Pomfret School, he entered Yale University in 1957, with the intention of pursuing pre-med studies, only to switch his major to art history. At Yale, he was tapped into the secret society Scroll and Key. His mentors at Yale included Josef Albers, Richard Lindner and Vincent Scully. Beard graduated with a BA in 1961. 

Inspired by earlier trips to Africa in both 1955 and 1960, Beard traveled to Kenya upon graduation. Working at Tsavo National Park, he photographed and documented the demise of 35,000 elephants and other wildlife, later to become the subject of his first book, The End of the Game.  During this time, Beard acquired Hog Ranch, a property near the Ngong Hills adjacent to the coffee farm owned by Karen Blixen, which would become his lifelong home-base in East Africa.

Art

Beard's photographs of Africa, African animals and journals that often integrate his photographs have been widely shown and published since the 1970s. Each of his works is unique, a combination of his photography with elements derived from his daily diary-keeping, a practice he continued until his death in 2020. These volumes contain newspaper clippings, dried leaves, insects, old sepia-toned photos, transcribed telephone messages, marginalia in India ink, photographs of women, quotes, found objects, and the like; these become incorporated, with original drawings and collage by Beard. Certain of his works incorporate animal blood, sometimes Beard's own blood (in sparing quantities), a painting medium the artist favored.

The Peter Beard Studio and Archive was started by Peter and Nejma Beard, and is the primary source for artwork by Peter Beard.  The Archive maintains a repository of published and unpublished written and visual material relating to the artist's life, work, projects, travels, exhibitions, and relations with his cohort.

Beard's first exhibition was at the Blum Helman Gallery, New York City, in 1975.  Landmark museum exhibitions have been held at the International Center of Photography, New York City, in 1977, and the Centre national de la photographie, Paris, in 1997. Gallery exhibitions followed in Berlin, London, Toronto, Madrid, Milan, Tokyo and Vienna. Beard's work is included in private collections throughout the world.

Personal life

Descended from distinguished American families on both sides, Beard was one of three sons born to Roseanne (Hoare) Beard and Anson McCook Beard, Jr.  His great-grandfather, James Jerome Hill, founded the Great Northern Railway in the United States in the late 19th century, and used his railroad fortune to become a great patron of the arts.  All of his heirs were exposed to and owned great collections, presumably having a strong influence on Beard's interests in the arts and beauty.

Beard married his first wife, Mary "Minnie" Olivia Cochran Cushing in 1967; their marriage lasted only briefly.  His second wife was Cheryl Tiegs, the fashion model, from 1982 to 1986.

In 1986, he married Nejma Khanum. The couple had a daughter, Zara (born 1988), for whom his book, Zara's Tales, was written.        

In 1996, he was badly injured by an elephant but survived.  

Beard befriended and in some cases collaborated with many artists, including Andy Warhol, Andrew Wyeth, Francis Bacon, Karen Blixen, Truman Capote, Richard Lindner, and Salvador Dalí. He also photographed many other well-known people. He appeared in Adolfas Mekas's film, Hallulujah the Hills, in 1963, at the first New York Film Festival.

Death
On the afternoon of March 31, 2020 Beard, who was suffering from dementia and ill health after a stroke, wandered away from his Montauk, Long Island home. Despite exhaustive searches he was not found.

On April 19, Beard's body was found by a hunter in a densely wooded area in Camp Hero State Park in Montauk Point, New York.

Publications

Selected books

 Graham, Alistair, and Beard, Peter (1973). Eyelids of Morning: The Mingled Destinies of Crocodiles and Men. Greenwich, CT: New York Graphic Society. 
 Beard, Peter; and Gatura, Kamante (1975). Longing for Darkness: Kamante's Tales from Out of Africa. New York: Harcourt Brace Jovanovich. 
 Beard, Peter (2004). Zara's Tales: Perilous Escapades in Equatorial Africa. New York: Knopf. 
 Beard, Peter (1965). The End of the Game. New York: Viking Press.  Reprinted New York: Doubleday, 1977.  Japan: Camera Manichi, 1978.  Germany: Taschen, 2008.  
 Beard, Peter; Beard, Nejma; Edwards, Owen; Aronson, Steven M.L. (2008). Peter Beard (Collector's Edition). Germany: Taschen, 2006. (Art Edition) Germany: Taschen, 2007.  (Trade Edition) Germany: Taschen, 2008, 2013, and 2020. 
 Beard, Peter; Paul Theroux.  50th Anniversary Edition of The End of the Game.  Taschen.  ISBN-978-3-8365-5547-0

Catalogues
 
Beard, Peter (1993). Diary: From a Dead Man's Wallet: Confessions of a Bookmaker. Japan: Libroport Publishing Co., Ltd. 
 Beard, Peter, and Caujolle, Christian (1996). Peter Beard: Photo Poche #67. Paris: Centre national de la photographie, 
 Beard, Peter (1997). Oltre la fine del Mondo. Milan: Grafiche Milani.
 Beard, Peter (1998). Beyond the End of the World. Milan: Universe Publishing (a division of Rizzoli International Publications, Inc.).  
 Beard, Peter (1999). Peter Beard: Stress & Density. Vienna: KunstHausWien, Museums Betriebs Gesellschaft, mbH. 
 Beard, Peter (1999). Peter Beard: Fifty Years of Portraits. Santa Fe, NM: Arena Editions.

Further reading

 Geldzahler, Henry (1975).  Francis Bacon: Recent Paintings.  Interview with Francis Bacon by Peter Beard.  New York: The Metropolitan Museum of Art.
 Bowermaster, Jon (1993). The adventures and misadventures of Peter Beard in Africa. Boston: Bulfinch Press, 1993.

Filmography

References

External links

 

1938 births
2020 deaths
20th-century American photographers
20th-century American writers
American diarists
American portrait photographers
American socialites
Artists from New York (state)
Nature photographers
Pomfret School alumni
Writers from New York (state)
Yale University alumni